"Had a Dream (For the Heart)" is a song written by Dennis Linde. It was originally recorded by Teresa Brewer as "For the Heart" on her 1975 album, Unliberated Woman, and then covered by Elvis Presley, also as "For the Heart", on his 1976 album From Elvis Presley Boulevard, Memphis, Tennessee. Presley's version, the A-side from the album with "Hurt" as the B-side, peaked at number 45 on the Hot Country Songs charts that year.

The Judds covered the song and released it as their debut single in December 1983, from their debut EP, Wynonna & Naomi.  The song reached number 17 on the same chart.

Chart performance

Elvis Presley

The Judds

References

1975 songs
1976 singles
1983 debut singles
Teresa Brewer songs
Elvis Presley songs
The Judds songs
Songs written by Dennis Linde
Song recordings produced by Brent Maher
RCA Records singles
Curb Records singles